Alfred Tarski asked the following mathematical questions:
For Tarski's problem about the elementary theory of free groups see free group. 
Tarski's circle-squaring problem
Tarski's plank problem
Tarski's exponential function problem
Tarski monster group
Tarski's high school algebra problem